Aṭ-Ṭāriq (also known as the Morning Star and by various other names), is the eighty-sixth sura of the Quran, with 17 ayat or verses. Muslims believe this chapter was sent to Muhammad when he was in Mecca.

Summary
1-3 Oath by the star of piercing brightness
4 Every soul has its guardian angel
5-8 God the Creator, and therefore can raise the dead
9-10 The judgment-day shall reveal secret thoughts
11-14 Oaths by heaven and earth that the Quran is God’s word
15-17 Muhammad exhorted to bear patiently with the unbelievers plotting his ruin

Exegesis

1-4  Sins are being recorded
In this sura, God (Allah) takes an oath by the sky and At-Tariq to say that there is an assigned watcher over every human being and all the deeds and sins done by human beings are being recorded.

5-7 Between the backbone and the ribs
Allah then asks the human beings to think about how they were created. He then goes on to say that he has created human beings from the gushing water flowing between the backbone and the ribs.

8-10 Judgment Day
Allah then reminds the human beings about the Judgment Day, the day when all the secrets would be revealed. On that day, human beings would have no power and no one would help them.

11-14 Oath on the heaven and the earth
God then takes another oath on the heaven and the earth to say that, whatever being said here is word of God and must be taken very seriously.

15-17 Non-believers plotting a scheme
In the last three verses of the chapter, Allah says that the non-believers are plotting a scheme but in return God is also planning a scheme.

Hadith
The first and foremost exegesis/tafsir of the Quran is found in hadith of Muhammad. Although scholars including ibn Taymiyyah claim that Muhammad has commented on the whole of the Quran, others including Ghazali cite the limited amount of narratives, thus indicating that he has commented only on a portion of the Quran. Ḥadīth (حديث) is literally "speech" or "report", that is a recorded saying or tradition of Muhammad validated by isnad; with Sirah Rasul Allah these comprise the sunnah and reveal shariah. According to Aishah, the life of Prophet Muhammad was practical implementation of Quran. Therefore, mention in hadith elevates the importance of the pertinent surah from a certain perspective. According to hadith, the prophet Muhammad used to recite this surah in Zuhr prayer and Asr prayer.

 Jabir bin Samurah narrated: "For Zuhr and Asr, Allah's Messenger would recite: By the heavens, holding the Buruj (Surah 85) and (By the heavens and At-Tariq) and similar to them."

References

External links
Q86:7, 50+ translations, islamawakened.com
Quran 86 Clear Quran translation

Tariq
Islamic eschatology
Judgment in Islam